The Hole is a 15-minute animated film by John Hubley and Faith Hubley.

Summary
The film uses improvised dialogue from Dizzy Gillespie and George Mathews as two construction workers at work in the bottom of a hole on a construction site discussing the possibility of an accidental nuclear weapons attack.

Accolades
The film won an Academy Award for Best Animated Short Film in 1962.

Legacy
In 2013, the film was selected for preservation in the United States National Film Registry by the Library of Congress as being "culturally, historically, or aesthetically significant". The Academy Film Archive preserved The Hole in 2003.

References

External links 
 The Hole essay by Greg Cwik on the National Film Registry website

 The Hole on Internet Archive

1962 animated films
1962 films
1960s American animated films
1960s animated short films
Best Animated Short Academy Award winners
Films about nuclear war and weapons
Films directed by John Hubley
United States National Film Registry films